Martine Ohr (born 11 June 1964) is a retired Dutch field hockey striker, who won a gold medal at the 1984 Summer Olympics and a bronze at the 1988 Games. She also participated in the 1992 Summer Olympics, where the Dutch team finished sixth. Between 1983 and 1992 she played 109 international matches and scored 19 goals.

References

External links
 

1964 births
Living people
Dutch female field hockey players
Olympic field hockey players of the Netherlands
Field hockey players at the 1984 Summer Olympics
Field hockey players at the 1988 Summer Olympics
Field hockey players at the 1992 Summer Olympics
Olympic gold medalists for the Netherlands
Olympic bronze medalists for the Netherlands
People from Den Helder
Olympic medalists in field hockey
Medalists at the 1988 Summer Olympics
Medalists at the 1984 Summer Olympics
Sportspeople from North Holland
21st-century Dutch women
20th-century Dutch women